Shibu Soren (born 11 January 1944) is an Indian politician who thrice served as Chief Minister of Jharkhand, first in 2005 for 10 days (2 March to 12 March), then from 2008 to 2009 and again from 2009 to 2010. He was sworn in as the third Chief Minister of Jharkhand on 30 December 2009 after winning the Jharkhand Assembly elections. He resigned on 30 May 2010 after failing to obtain coalition support from the Bharatiya Janata Party, his national party partner. He previously represented the Dumka constituency of Jharkhand in the 14th Lok Sabha, and is the President of the Jharkhand Mukti Morcha (JMM) political party, a constituent of the UPA.

On 9 January 2009, Soren was defeated in the by-election for the Tamar assembly constituency by political novice Gopal Krishna Patar, alias Raja Peter, of the Jharkhand Party by a margin of over 9,000 votes. Soon he contested another by poll after the rebel BJP MLA Bishnu Prasad Bhaiya resigned from his seat in his favour and Soren won the by election from that Jamtara constituency. But the Government could not last longer. In 2009 after the Assembly elections Soren once again formed the Government along with the BJP, and was sworn in as Chief Minister of Jharkhand on 30 December 2009.

He was the Minister for Coal in the Union Cabinet in November 2006, when a Delhi district court found him guilty in the murder of his private secretary Shashi Nath Jha in 1994. He has also been indicted in the past on other criminal charges.

Life
Soren was born in Nemra village of Ramgarh district, in what was, at the time, Bihar state, India. He belongs to Santal tribe. He completed his schooling in the same district. During his schooling his father was murdered by thugs employed by money lenders.

At the age of 18, he formed the Santhal Navyuvak Sangh. 
In 1972, Bengali Maxist trade union leader A. K. Roy, Kurmi-Mahato leader Binod Bihari Mahato and Santal leader Shibu Soren formed Jharkhand Mukti Morcha. Soren became the general secretary of JMM. JMM organised agitations to reclaim the tribal lands which were alienated. They started forcibly harvesting in the lands. Shibu Soren was known for delivering summary justice against landlords and money lenders, sometimes by holding own courts. On 23 January 1975, he allegedly incited a campaign to drive away "outsiders", or the 'non-tribal' people. At least eleven people were killed. Soren and numerous others were charged with various crimes related to this incident. After extended legal proceedings, Soren was acquitted on 6 March 2008. However, possibly related incitement charges—dating from two earlier deaths in 1974—remain pending.

He lost his first Lok Sabha election in 1977. He was first elected to the Lok Sabha in 1980 from Dumka. An arrest warrant was issued against him. He was subsequently elected to the Lok Sabha in 1989, 1991 and 1996 as well. In 2002, he was elected to the Rajya Sabha. He won the Dumka Lok Sabha seat in a by-election the same year and resigned his Rajya Sabha seat. He was re-elected in 2004.

He became the Union Coal Minister in the Manmohan Singh government, but was asked to resign following an arrest warrant in his name in the thirty-year-old Chirudih case. He was one of the main accused amongst 69, with allegations to kill 10 people (including 9 Muslims) on 23 January 1975, in a clash between tribals and Muslims. After the warrant was issued, he initially went underground. He resigned on 24 July 2004. He was able to secure bail after spending over a month in judicial custody; released on bail on 8 September, he was re-inducted into the Union Cabinet and given back the coal ministry on 27 November 2004, as part of a deal for a Congress-JMM alliance before assembly elections in Jharkhand in February/March 2005.

On 2 March 2005, after much political bargaining and quid pro quo he was invited to form the government in Jharkhand by the Governor of Jharkhand. He resigned as Chief Minister nine days later, on 11 March, following his failure to obtain a vote of confidence in the assembly. In 2019 Lok Sabha Elections he lost to Sunil Soren of BJP from Dumka constituency.

Life imprisonment and acquittal
On 28 November 2006, Soren was found guilty in a twelve-year-old case involving the kidnapping and murder of his former personal secretary Shashinath Jha. It was claimed that Jha was abducted from the Dhaula Kuan area in Delhi on 22 May 1994 and taken to Piska Nagari near Ranchi where he was killed. The CBI chargesheet stated that Jha's knowledge of the reported deal between the Congress and the JMM to save the Narasimha Rao government during the July 1993 no-confidence motion and an act of sodomy was the motive behind the murder. The charge-sheet asserted that: "Jha was aware of the illegal transactions and also expected and demanded a substantial share out of this amount from Soren." .

Soren resigned from his post of Union Minister for Coal after Prime Minister Manmohan Singh demanded that he should do so in the wake of the verdict. This is the first case of a Union Minister of the Government of India being found guilty of involvement in a murder. On 5 December 2006, Shibu Soren was sentenced to life imprisonment. A Delhi court rejected his bail plea, stating: 'We cannot overlook the fact that the appellant (Soren) has been convicted after a detailed and elaborate trial only in November 2006 and sentenced in December 2006.

The bench also noted that he was also being tried in a number of other cases, including the case of mass murder in Jharkhand.

On 25 June 2007, Shibu Soren was being escorted to his jail in Dumka, Jharkhand when his convoy was attacked by bombs, but no one was hurt.

The Delhi High Court on 23 August 2007 overruled the District Court and acquitted Soren,  stating that "The trial court's analysis is far from convincing and not sustainable."

The five men convicted by the Tis Hazari court were held guilty of criminal conspiracy, abduction and murder primarily on the basis of forensic evidence provided by a post-mortem report of a body discovered in Jharkhand, namely a skull superimposition test and skull injury report. This was in addition to eyewitness accounts and some circumstantial evidence.

Personal life 

He is married to Roopi Kisku. He has three sons Durga Soren, Hemant Soren, and Basant Soren and a daughter, Anjali Soren. Hemant Soren is the current Chief Minister of Jharkhand, having held the same office previously from July 2013 to December 2014. His elder son Durga Soren was MLA from Jama from 1995 to 2005. Durga's wife Sita Soren is current MLA from Jama.  Basant Soren is president of the Jharkhand Yuva Morcha, a youth wing of Jharkhand Mukti Morcha and current MLA from Dumka.

References

External links
 Controversies have always tailed Shibu Soren - 123bharath.com article dated 20 July 2004
 Jharkhand cops chasing Union minister with arrest warrant - rediff.com article dated 21 July 2004
 Shibu Soren goes underground - Mid Day article dated 21 July 2004
 PM asks Shibu Soren to resign - Indian Express article dated 24 July 2004
 Shibu Soren resigns after arrest warrant - Yahoo! India News story dated 24 July 2004
 Shibu Soren: from farmer's son to fugitive minister - 123bharath.com article dated 24 July 2004
 Shibu Soren appointed as Chief Minister of Jharkhand - Indiainfo.com article dated 2 March 2004
 Shibu Soren sworn in as Jharkhand CM - rediff.com article dated 2 March 2004
 Home Page on the Parliament of India's Website
 News timeline for Shibu Soren

1944 births
Living people
Santali people
Chief Ministers of Jharkhand
Overturned convictions
People acquitted of murder
Jharkhand Mukti Morcha politicians
Rajya Sabha members from Bihar
Rajya Sabha members from Jharkhand
India MPs 1980–1984
India MPs 1989–1991
India MPs 1991–1996
India MPs 1996–1997
India MPs 1999–2004
India MPs 2004–2009
India MPs 2009–2014
India MPs 2014–2019
People from Ramgarh district
Lok Sabha members from Jharkhand
People from Dumka district
People from Jamtara district
Coal Ministers of India